Sharon Birgitta Dyall (born 28 December 1962) is a Swedish singer, actress and voice actress. She became famous in the late 1980s when she acted in the SVT TV series Varuhuset. She has since become known as a singer of soul and jazz music and as a musical performer. She has appeared in many theatre productions including West Side Story (Chinateatern, 1989), A Chorus Line (Riksteatern, 1996), Nine (Malmö Opera, 2002) and Chicago (Stockholms Stadsteater, 2014, 2015).
Aside from being active on stage and within the field of dubbing, Dyall also holds a degree in Logonomy, Aesthetic Voice and Speech Pedagogy (University College of Music Education) teaching in Voice and Artistic Performance Development.

Early life
Dyall was born in Sweden but grew up in London and Barbados. Her father was the jazz musician Colin Dyall. She learned how to play the piano and began dancing at the age of six. When the family moved to Sweden in the 1970s, she joined her father on tour as a backup singer. Her brother, Karl Dyall, is a Swedish dancer, singer and actor.

Career
In 1983, she became a member of the band Little Mike & The Sweet Soul Music Band along with band members Little Mike Watson, Nils Landgren, Anders Berglund, Claes af Geijerstam and Anna-Lotta Larsson.

In 1985, she released the solo album I Am. In the early 1990s she toured with  Anne Linnet and Sanne Salomonsen. She did the show Vårsoul along with Tommy Nilsson at Hamburger Börs in 1997.

In 1984, she started her career as a musical singer; she appeared in the musicals West Side Story and Guys and Dolls at Stockholms Parkteater, and the musical SKÅL at Maximteatern. In 1989, she was awarded the Guldmasken award for "Best supporting actress in a musical" for her role as "Anita" in the musical West Side Story at Chinateatern. She also received acclaim for her roles in the musicals Hair (Chinateatern, 1991), A Chorus Line (Riksteatern, 1996), Jekyll & Hyde (Östgötateatern, 1999–2000) and Nine (Malmö Opera, 2002). In 2014, and 2015, she had the leading role in the musical Chicago at Stockholms Stadsteater. and acted in 8 Women at the same theatre in 2018.

Her big breakthrough in acting came in 1987 with her role as "Tina" in the SVT drama series Varuhuset. She has since appeared in several films and television series, among them Rosenbaum in 1993 and Kommissarie Winter in 2010. She competed in Melodifestivalen 1991 singing "Ge mig ett svar", finishing in fifth place overall. The same year she appeared in the revue Hjalmars hotell at Parkteatern. In 1993, she acted in the revue show Mulliga vitaminer along with Birgitta Andersson and Ulf Brunnberg at Lorensbergsteatern in Göteborg.

Dyall has sung a lot of jazz along with bands such as Peter Asplund trio och Peter Asplund Big Band Show, Claes Crona Trio, Blue House Jazz Orchestra, Stockholms Jazz Orchestra, Mats Holmqvists Stora Stygga, Bohuslän Big Band, Sandviken Big Band and Norrbotten Big Band. In 2007 she released the jazz album Another Angle. She has also been a backup singer for singers such as Mauro Scocco, Lisa Nilsson, Eagle-Eye Cherry, Björn Skifs, Titiyo, Ola Magnell and Nils Landgren.

In her career as an actress and singer, she also works as a dubbing director at Sun Studio (SDI) and Dubberman studio. She has overseen the Swedish dubbing of films such as Ice Age and The Princess and the Frog and has also done a great deal of dubbing work herself, for instance she has often dubbed the voice of Helena Bonham Carter and is the long-standing character voice of Daphne in the Scooby-Doo Movies and Television series. In 2013, she wrote the Swedish translation for the lyrics of songs from the Disney film Frozen.

Discography
1978: Modern Sound Corporation
1983–85: Little Mike & the Sweet Soul Music Band
1984–85: Nils Landgren & the Cosmic Beavers
1985: I Am
1991: Ge mig ett svar, contributions in Melodifestivalen
1996:  For All We Know with Magnum Coltrane Price on Stora Stygga CD Standards  
1996: Esmeraldas Bön, soundtrack of Disney's Ringaren i Notre Dame (English title The Hunchback of Notre Dame)
1997: Nu Är Du Min & Vad Skall Du Med Mig Till  (Text/Music: Mauro Scocco)
2000: Våra Systrar gå i Brokiga Kläder, poems by Karin Boye
2001: Totta Näslund Duetter
2002:  Andliga Klassiker, Björn Hedström
2004: Totta 7 Soul/På drift
2006–18: Christmas with My Friends (6 volumes) with Nils Landgren
2007: Another Angle, with Tommy Berndtsson 
2016: Disney Rariteter, soundtracks from Disney films

Audio books 
2007: Tusen strålande solar of Khaled Hosseini (Bonnier Audio)
2008: Järngreppet of Aino Trosell (Norstedts)
2009: Tionde gåvan of Jane Johnson (Bonnier Audio)
2009: Ett ljus i mörkret of Agneta Sjödin (Bonnier Audio)
2010: Nattönskningen of Anne B Ragde (Bonnier Audio)
2013: Hatties Liv of Ayana Mathis (Earbooks)

Filmography
1987 – Jessie (TV series) (voice as Mrs Chesterfield)
1987 – Varuhuset (TV series)
1988 – Oliver & gänget (voice as Rita)
1991 – Rosenbaum, (TV series)
1991 – Kopplingen (TV series)
1996 – Ringaren i Notre Dame (film, 1996) (voice as Esmeralda)
1996 – Dragonball Z (TV series, 1996) (voice as Son Gohan)
1997 – Herkules (voice as Terpsichore)
1998 – Prinsen av Egypten (voice as Zipporah)
2000 – My Dog Skip (voice as Ellen)
2000 – Buzz Lightyear (voice as Mira Nova)
2000 – En extremt långbent film (voice as Sylvia Marpole)
2000 – Flykten från hönsgården (voice as  Jenny)
2000 – Titan A.E. (voice as Stith)
2001 – E.T. the Extra-Terrestrial (voice as Mary)
2001 – Rasten (TV series, voice as Fröken Grotke)
2001 – Prop och Bertha (voice as Bertha)
2001 – Som hund och katt (voice as Ivy)
2002 – Country Bears (voice as Crystal)
2003 – A Christmas Carol (voice as  Unga Clara)
2003 – Barbie i Svansjön (voice as Fågelprinsessan)
2003 – Ballerina/Småbusar (voice as Berättaren)
2003 – Dragon Ball Z (voice as Son Gohan)
2003 – Like Mike (voice as Janet)
2003 – Bionicle: Ljusets mask (voice as Turaga Nokama)
2003 – Peter Pan (voice as Mrs. Darling)
2004 – Gustaf (voice as Arlene)
2004 – Bionicle 2: Legenderna från Metru Nui (voice as Nokama)
2004 – Harry Potter och fången från Azkaban (voice as Den tjocka damen)
2005 – Zuper-Zebran (voice as Fia)
2005 – Bionicle 3: Nät av skuggor (voice as Nokama)
2005 – Valiant och de fjäderlätta hjältarna (voice as Victoria)
2005 – El Cid (voice)
2005 – Ben 10 (TV series) (voice)
2006 – Kalle i chokladfabriken (voice as Kalles mamma)
2007 – Harry Potter och Fenixorden (voice as Bellatrix Lestrange)
2007 – TMNT (voice as April O'Neil)
2007 – Animalia (TV series) (voice as Sarah, Sapi and Harmony-gris)
2008 – Madagaskar 2 (voice as Alexs mamma)
2008 – Våra vänner djuren (voice)
2010 – Alice i Underlandet (film)(voice as Röda Drottningen) 
2010 – Kommissarie Winter (TV series)
2010 – My Little Pony: Vänskap är magisk 
2011 – Scooby Doo! Mysteriegänget (TV series Voice as Daphne)
2010 – Det regnar köttbullar 
2010 – Till vildingarnas land 
2011 – Mästerkatten (voice as Imelda)
2011 – Rio (film, voice)
2011 – Jake och Piraterna i landet Ingenstans (TV series, voice as Röda Jessica)
2012 – Hotell Transylvanien (animated film)(Voice as Eunice)
2012 – De fem legenderna (animated film)
2012 – Violetta (TV Series) (Voice as Olga)
2014 – Länge leve Kung Julien (TV series) (voice as Xi-Xi and Masikura)
2015 – Hotell Transylvanien 2 (animated film)(Voice as Eunice)
2015 – Home (voice as Lucy Tucci)
2015 – Berättelsen om Askungen (voice as Gudmor)
2016 – Thunderbirds (voice as Överste Casey)
2016 – Zootropolis (voice as Instruktör)
2017 – Saknad (TV series)
2017 – Saltön (TV series)
2017 – The Emoji Movie (voice as Smajla)
2017 – Coco (voice as Tant Viktoria)
2017 – Pelle Kanin (film)
2017 – Stjärnan (film)(voice as Deborah)
2018 – Hodja och den flygande mattan (voice as Pärlsten)
2018 – Mästerdetektiven Sherlock Gnomes (animated film)(Voice as Irén)
2018 – Hotell Transylvanien 3 (animated film)(Voice as Eunice)

Theatre

References

External links

1962 births
Living people
People from Danderyd Municipality
Musicians from Stockholm County
Swedish women singer-songwriters
Swedish film actresses
Swedish television actresses
Swedish people of Barbadian descent
20th-century Swedish women singers
21st-century Swedish women singers
20th-century Swedish actresses
21st-century Swedish actresses
Melodifestivalen contestants of 1991